S.A.S. HPI Groupe is a French company established in 1993 
which engages in radio publishing and is based in Courcouronnes, France.

History

In 1993, the HPI Groupe is founded by Hervé du Plessix, and since then he is the President of the company. The HPI Groupe owns Évasion FM, a regional radio station broadcasting in the Île-de-France region, of which Du Plessix is also the President since 1991.

At the end of 2010 HPI acquires the radio station Chante France from Pierre Bellanger (CEO of the French radio network Skyrock) with projects to develop the station nationally.

References

External links

Radio broadcasting companies of France
Companies established in 1993